Nick Kyrgios was the defending champion, but withdrew before the tournament began.

John Isner won the title, defeating Ryan Harrison in the final, 7–6(8–6), 7–6(9–7).

Seeds
The top four seeds receive a bye into the second round.

Draw

Finals

Top half

Bottom half

Qualifying

Seeds

Qualifiers

Qualifying draw

First qualifier

Second qualifier

Third qualifier

Fourth qualifier

References
Main draw
Qualifying draw

2017 US Open Series
2017 ATP World Tour
2017 Singles
Atlanta